Colorado King (foaled 1959) was a South African Thoroughbred racehorse who also competed successfully in the United States. He was Champion Two Year Old (1961/62) and Three Year Old (1962/63) in South Africa, before being sold to race in the United States.

Conditioned in South Africa by trainer Sydney C. Laird, Colorado King won ten races in including the Cape Guineas, Cape Derby and the Durban July Handicap. Sold to an American racing partnership led by William R. (Fritz) Hawn, he raced under the Poltex Stable banner in California. There, under trainer Wally Dunn, Colorado King won six races in 1964 including the Hollywood Gold Cup in which he defeated Native Diver, the American Handicap where he equalled the world record for 9 furlongs and the Sunset Handicap at a mile and five-eighths by seven lengths. In 1965 he won only once in nine starts before being retired to stud where he met with limited success as a sire.

References
 Colorado King detailed profile
 Article on Colorado King by Mark Anthony at SAHorseRacing.com
Pedigree
A King Of All : Won Durban July and Derby in SA. Sporting Post. April 4, 2015
Partial statistics - equibase.com
COAST RACE GOES TO COLORADO KING BY TWO LENGTHS. New York Times. July 19, 1964.
Colorado King Takes Sunset Handicap by Seven Lengths. New York Times. July 26, 1964. 
Colorado King Takes Coast Handicap and Equals World Mark for 1⅛ Miles. New York Times. July 5, 1964. 

1959 racehorse births
Thoroughbred family 18
Racehorses bred in South Africa
Racehorses trained in South Africa
Racehorses trained in the United States